Bishop P. Solomon (3 June 1910 – 21 August 2002) was the third Bishop-in-Dornakal Diocese of the Church of South India who succeeded A. B. Elliott.  Ever since Solomon chose the vocation of Priesthood, he maintained celibacy and served the Church throughout his life.

Solomon had his spiritual formation at the United Theological College, Bangalore where he studied from 1936-1940 for the graduate course leading to Bachelor of Divinity awarded by the Senate of Serampore College (University), India's first {a University under Section 2 (f) of the University Grants Commission Act, 1956} with degree-granting authority validated by a Danish Charter and ratified by the Government of West Bengal.

After Solomon's return from Bangalore, he was ordained in 1947 by Frank Whittaker in Medak.  In 1956 Solomon was a missionary in Swindon and to the British Isles.

Rajaiah David Paul writes that while Solomon out of the country, he was elected bishop.  Solomon was consecrated on 27 November 1956 as the third Bishop-in-Dornakal by H. Sumitra, Moderator and J. E. L. Newbigin, Deputy Moderator of the Church of South India Synod at the CSI-Epiphany Cathedral in Dornakal.  Solomon led the bishopric of Dornakal from 1956 to 1979.  The Diocese of Dornakal was split in 1978, resulting in the creation of the Diocese of Karimnagar.
M. Edwin Rao, who compiled a centennial edition of the Diocese of Dornakal, writes that Solomon attended ecclesiastical conclaves the world over,
1956, World Methodist Conference, United States of America,
1956, Audience with Eisenhower along with other delegates attending World Methodist Conference,
1968, the tenth Lambeth Conference presided by Michael Ramsey, the Archbishop of Canterbury.
1961, World Methodist Conference, Oslo,
1965, Guest of honour of Patriarch of Syriac Orthodox Church, Damascus,
1967, British Methodist Missionary Society consultation, Manchester
1967, Congress on Evangelism by Billy Graham,
1967, East Asia Christian Council, Bangkok,
1968, the fourth assembly of the World Council of Churches held at Uppsala,
1969, Consultation on Church Union in Kenya-East Africa,
1969, Audience with the Emperor of Ethiopia at Addis Ababa,
1969, Audience with the Patriarch of Coptic Church in Addis Ababa,

References

Further reading
 

Telugu people
20th-century Anglican bishops in India
Anglican bishops of Dornakal
Indian Methodists
Indian Christian theologians
People from Khammam district
1910 births
2002 deaths
Senate of Serampore College (University) alumni
Indian bishops
Moderators of the Church of South India